Robert W. Duden (September 5, 1920 – March 22, 1995) was an American professional golfer who played on the PGA Tour in the 1950s and 1960s.

A lifelong resident of Portland, Oregon, Duden compiled a remarkable record in sectional golf competition. He won over 50 tournaments in a 40-year career that included 23 major Pacific Northwest Section events including a record 7 wins of the Pacific Northwest Senior PGA Championship; he won the Oregon Open a record eight times.  In competition on the PGA Tour, Duden's best showings were three 2nd place ties between 1959 and 1964. His best finish in a major championship was T-46 at the 1954 U.S. Open.

Duden invented and patented the croquet style putter, which he named "The Dude". When other well-known professionals like Sam Snead adopted this revolutionary putting technique, its popularity began to surge; however, the USGA banned it when traditionalists like Bobby Jones objected.

Duden had 22 holes-in-one during his career. In his later years, he worked as a teaching pro at Glendoveer Golf Course, where an annual tournament bears his name. Duden was inducted into the Pacific Northwest Section PGA Hall of Fame in 1993 and the Oregon Sports Hall of Fame in 1995.

Regular career wins
this list is incomplete
1952 Oregon Open
1953 Oregon Open
1958 Almaden Open
1959 Oregon Open, Northwest Open
1960 Washington Open, Sahara Pro-Am, British Columbia Open
1961 Pacific Northwest PGA Championship, British Columbia Open
1962 Oregon Open
1963 Northwest Open
1965 Willow Park Pro-Am (Canada)
1966 Pacific Northwest PGA Championship
1967 Oregon Open
1968 Northwest Open
1969 Oregon Open, Washington Open
1970 Oregon Open, Washington Open, Pacific Northwest PGA Championship
1973 Oregon Open
1977 Pay Less Classic

Senior career wins
this list is incomplete
1971 Pacific Northwest Senior PGA Championship
1973 Pacific Northwest Senior PGA Championship
1975 Pacific Northwest Senior PGA Championship
1976 Pacific Northwest Senior PGA Championship
1978 Pacific Northwest Senior PGA Championship
1979 Pacific Northwest Senior PGA Championship
1982 Pacific Northwest Senior PGA Championship

U.S. national team appearances
PGA Cup: 1977 (tie)

References

American male golfers
PGA Tour golfers
Golfers from Portland, Oregon
1920 births
1995 deaths